Qeshlaq-e Diz (also Romanized as Qeshlāq-e Dīz) is a village in Shal Rural District, Shahrud District, Khalkhal County, Ardabil Province, Iran. At the 2006 census, its population was 330, in 79 families.

References 

Tageo

Towns and villages in Khalkhal County